Leece is a surname. Notable people with the surname include:

Stephen Leece (born 1991), American professional racing cyclist
Terry Leece (born 1957), Australian field hockey player